Cody Reed Kasch (born August 21, 1987) is an American actor. He is known for his role of Zach Young on the ABC comedy-drama series Desperate Housewives.

Early life
Kasch was born in Santa Monica, California. He is of Scottish descent.  He was raised in Ojai, California on a working ranch until the age of 13, when he moved to Camarillo, California. Both of Kasch's parents were actively involved in the arts. His father was an actor and writer of locally premiering plays, and his mother was a director and photographer. As his older brother, actor Max Kasch, began to experience success, the brothers competed for jobs; their success caused the entire Kasch family to leave Ojai and move to the more favorably located Camarillo.

Career
After numerous television guest appearances, Kasch got his first major role when he was cast in a regular role on the sitcom Normal, Ohio, only for the series to be cancelled after a few episodes. Kasch portrayed a Texan high school student in the Noggin comedy-drama series Out There. He played Zach Young, the son of deceased Mary Alice Young, on the ABC comedy-drama series Desperate Housewives. After a brief absence from the series, he returned in the third and seventh seasons as Gabrielle Solis' secret admirer. He is also the narrator for several audiobooks. He starred in the 2010 horror film Chain Letter.

Filmography

Awards and nominations

References

External links
 

1987 births
20th-century American male actors
21st-century American male actors
American male film actors
American male television actors
American people of Scottish descent
Living people
Male actors from Greater Los Angeles
People from Ojai, California
Male actors from Santa Monica, California
People from Camarillo, California